Tom F. Gustafson Jr. (born October 9, 1949) is an American attorney and politician, who served as Speaker of the Florida House of Representatives from 1988 to 1990. A member of the Democratic Party, Gustafson served in the Florida House of Representatives from 1977 to 1990, during which time he also served as majority whip from 1978 to 1980. Though born in New Jersey, Gustafson moved to Florida the year he was born, and attended the University of Florida Law School after graduating from the University of Notre Dame.

References

External links

|-

|-

1949 births
Living people
Democratic Party members of the Florida House of Representatives
People from Ocean City, New Jersey